"WIN350" was the name given to the  6-car experimental high-speed Shinkansen train developed in 1992 by the West Japan Railway Company (JR West) in Japan to test technology to be incorporated in next-generation shinkansen trains expected to operate at speeds of  from 1994. Initially given the designation "500X", the name "WIN350" stood for "West Japan's Innovation for operation at 350 km/h".

Design
Cars 500-901 to 500-903 were built by Kawasaki Heavy Industries in Hyogo Prefecture. Cars 500-904 to 500-906 were built by Hitachi in Yamaguchi Prefecture.

The front-end designs of the two driving vehicles (500-901 and 500-906) were slightly different, with 500-906 featuring a "cockpit" style arrangement. The external livery was purple and light grey, with darker purple lining.

All axles were motored, using 300 kW three-phase motors, and cars were equipped with tilting and active suspension.

Internally, only car 4 was fitted with passenger seats, with 10 rows of 3+2 standard-class seating and 5 rows of 2+2 Green class (first class) seating.

Formation
The 6-car set, designated "W0", was formed as follows.

Initially, cars 1, 2, and 5 were fitted with pantographs.

History
The WIN350 train was delivered to Hakata Shinkansen Depot in April 1992.

The WIN350 trainset was withdrawn on 31 May 1996, and a special farewell ceremony was held at Hakata Shinkansen Depot.

Preservation

End car 500-901 is preserved outdoors at the RTRI large-scale wind tunnel test facility in Maibara, Shiga. Initially expected to be moved to the Modern Transportation Museum in Osaka, end car 500-906 is preserved at Hakata Shinkansen Depot.

References

External links

Experimental and prototype high-speed trains
Shinkansen train series
Train-related introductions in 1992
Sanyō Shinkansen
Hitachi multiple units
Kawasaki multiple units
25 kV AC multiple units